La odalisca No. 13 ("Odalisque Number 13") is a 1958 Mexican comedy film starring Germán Valdés, María Antonieta Pons, and Viruta and Capulina (Marco Antonio Campos and Gaspar Henaine).

External links

Mexican comedy films
1958 comedy films
1950s Mexican films
1950s Spanish-language films